Wiik is a Norwegian, a Swedish and a Finnish surname.

People with the surname Wiik include:

Academics
Björn Wiik, a Norwegian physicist
Fredrik Johan Wiik, a Finnish geologist
Kalevi Wiik, a Finnish linguist

Performers
Aurélien Wiik, a French actor
Håvard Wiik, a Norwegian musician
Øystein Wiik, a Norwegian actor and singer
Ryan Wiik, an actor

Politicians
Johan Wiik, an American politician
Karl H. Wiik, a Finnish politician
Jofrid Wiik, a Norwegian politician
Lise Wiik, a Norwegian politician

Sportspeople
Melissa Wiik, a Norwegian footballer
Lisa Wiik, a Norwegian snowboarder
Rolf Wiik, a Finnish fencer

Others
Maria Wiik, a Finnish painter